David Beaton (also Beton or Bethune; 29 May 1546) was Archbishop of St Andrews and the last Scottish cardinal prior to the Reformation.

Career
Cardinal Beaton was the sixth and youngest son of eleven children of John Beaton (Bethune) of Balfour in the county of Fife, and his wife Mary, daughter of Sir David Boswell of Balmuto. The Bethunes of Balfour were part of Clan Bethune, the Scottish branch of the noble French House of Bethune. The Cardinal is said to have been born in 1494. He was educated at the universities of St Andrews and Glasgow, and in his sixteenth year was sent to Paris, where he studied civil and canon law. In 1519 King James V of Scotland named him ambassador in France.

In 1520, his uncle, James Beaton, Archbishop of Glasgow, named David Beaton Rector and Prebendary at Cambuslang. After his uncle became Archbishop of St. Andrews in 1522, he resigned the position of Commendator of Arbroath in favour of his nephew. In 1525 David Beaton returned from France and took a seat as Lord Abbot of Arbroath in the Scottish Parliament. In 1528 the King named him Lord Privy Seal.

Between 1533 and 1542 he acted several times as King James V of Scotland's ambassador to France. He took a leading part in the negotiations connected with the King's marriages, first with Madeleine of France, and afterwards with Mary of Guise. In 1537 he was made coadjutor to his uncle at St. Andrews, with right of succession.

In December 1537 Beaton was made Bishop of Mirepoix in Languedoc on the recommendation of King Francis I, and consecrated the following summer. Presumably he was ordained around that time. Also in 1538 he was appointed a Cardinal by Pope Paul III, under the title of St Stephen in the Caelian Hill. In February 1539 Cardinal Beaton succeeded his uncle as Archbishop of St. Andrews. In 1544, he was made Papal legate in Scotland.

Politically, Beaton was preoccupied with the maintenance of the Franco-Scottish alliance, and opposing Anglophile political attitudes, which were associated with the clamour for Protestant reform in Scotland.

Relations became strained between James V and his uncle, Henry VIII of England, who sought to detach Scotland from its allegiance to the Holy See and bring it into subjection to himself. Henry sent two successive embassies to Scotland to urge James to follow his example in renouncing the authority of the Pope in his dominions. King James declined to be drawn into Henry's plans and refused to leave his kingdom for a meeting with Henry. Hostilities broke out between the two kingdoms in 1542. The Cardinal was blamed by many for the war with England that led to the defeat at Solway Moss in November 1542.

During Mary's reign

James V died at Falkland Palace on 14 December 1542. Beaton tried to become one of the regents for the infant sovereign Mary, Queen of Scots. He based his claim on an alleged will of the late King; but the will was generally regarded as forged, and The 2nd Earl of Arran, heir presumptive to the throne, was declared regent. A copy of the alleged will was preserved by  Regent Arran. Dated 14 December 1542 in the King's bedchamber at Falkland Palace, it was witnessed by James Learmonth of Dairsie, Master Household; Henry Kemp of Thomastoun, Gentleman of the Chamber; Michael Durham, the King's doctor; John Tennent, William Kirkcaldy of Grange, Master Michael Dysart, Preceptor of St Anthony's at Leith; John Jordan, Rector of Yetham; Francis Aikman, perfumerer, and others at the bedside.  However, the clerk who wrote the instrument, Henry Balfour, a canon of Dunkeld, was not a recognised notary.

By order of the Regent, Beaton was committed to the custody of Lord Seton, and imprisoned at Dalkeith Palace and then Blackness Castle. A papal interdict followed the arrest of the Cardinal Primate, according to which all churches of the country should be closed and administering the sacraments should be suspended.

With Beaton out of power, the Anglophile party persuaded Regent Arran to make a marriage treaty with England on behalf of the infant Queen, and to appoint a number of Protestant preachers. The treaties signed at Greenwich in July 1543 stipulated that Mary would be accompanied by an English nobleman/gentleman (and his wife) until she was ten years old and afterwards would reside in England until the time of her marriage. The union of the thrones of England and Scotland which the treaty envisaged was controversial from the start. Its Anglo-centric policy was resisted by many who preferred to continue the Auld Alliance with France. Resistance to the treaty resulted in a surge in the popularity of the French faction and the release of Beaton from prison. The Treaty of Greenwich was rejected by the Scottish Parliament on 11 December 1543, leading to eight years of Anglo-Scottish conflict known as the Rough Wooing. In 1543 Beaton regained power, having earlier drawn up the Secret Bond. Two English invasions followed – and for these many blamed Beaton.

In December 1545 Beaton arranged for the arrest, trial and execution of Protestant preacher George Wishart, who on 28 March 1546 was strangled and afterwards burned. Wishart had many sympathisers, and this led to the assassination of the Cardinal soon afterwards.

Death

Plots against Cardinal Beaton had begun circulating as early as 1544.
The conspirators were led by Norman Leslie, master of Rothes, and William Kirkcaldy of Grange. The Leslies had suffered from the expansion of Beaton's interest in Fife; while Kirkcaldy's uncle, James Kirkcaldy of Grange, held Protestant sympathies and had been removed in 1543 as treasurer of the realm, through Beaton's influence. They were joined by John Leslie of Parkhill, one of the Fife lairds angered at the murder of Wishart. Leslie and Kirkcaldy managed to obtain admission to St Andrews Castle at daybreak of 29 May 1546, killing the porter in the process. They then murdered the cardinal, mutilating the corpse and hanging it from a castle window. 

At the time it was widely believed that his death was in the interests of Henry VIII of England, who regarded Beaton as the chief obstacle to his policy in Scotland; the cardinal's murder was certainly a significant point in the eventual triumph of Protestantism north of the Border.

At the time of his death, Beaton was Lord Chancellor of Scotland, Archbishop of St Andrews, and Cardinal Legate in Scotland. He was succeeded as Archbishop of Saint Andrews by Dr. John Hamilton.

Marion Ogilvy
Beaton's mistress, Marion Ogilvy, was born in 1500, the youngest daughter of James Ogilvy, 1st Lord Ogilvy of Airlie. After the deaths of her parents, she managed the family estates in Angus. Around 1520 she met and fell in love with David Beaton. They lived in Ethie Castle and produced eight children. According to Margaret H.B. Sanderson, their relationship, which appeared little different from marriage, offended those who wanted serious reform of the church, and who deplored the double standard by which prelates punished those who advocated the marriage of the clergy yet lived in open concubinage in violation of the rule of clerical celibacy.

Cardinal Beaton's oldest surviving son, David Beaton of Melgund, became a Protestant, and later became master of the household to James VI and to Anne of Denmark. His daughter Margaret married David Lindsay, 10th Earl of Crawford, and Agnes married Alexander Gordon of Gight.

See also
 Cardinal Beaton, a play based on his life.

Notes

References

Sources

External links 
 Extract from John Knox's account of Beaton's murder
 1546 – Cardinal Beaton assassinated
 John Knox, History of the Reformation in Scotland, ed. David Laing (1846–1864)
 ii. (1900–1902)

Scottish cardinals
Bishops of Mirepoix
Scottish diplomats
Abbots of Arbroath
Alumni of the University of St Andrews
Alumni of the University of Glasgow
Archbishops of St Andrews
16th-century Roman Catholic archbishops in Scotland
Chancellors of the University of St Andrews
Assassinated Scottish politicians
Male murder victims
16th-century cardinals
1490s births
1546 deaths
Cambuslang
People murdered in Scotland
Court of James V of Scotland
People from Fife
Ambassadors of Scotland to France
16th-century diplomats
Scottish Roman Catholics

Year of birth uncertain